Bayne, Kansas, is the name of two former settlements:

 Bayne, Lincoln County, Kansas
 Bayne, Russell County, Kansas